Les Frères Mégri was a Moroccan rock band formed in Oujda, Morocco. The band consisted of four members, the three brothers, Hassan, Mahmoud and Younès Mégri, and their sister Jalila Mégri. Before the creation of the band, the four Megri brothers were popular session musicians, composers and producers from Morocco.

In the early seventies, after they signed a recording contract with Philips Records of France, Hassan and Mahmoud released four singles as Les Frères Mégri. "El Harib/Heya Essamra", "Galouli Ensaha/Kellemtini", "Sebar / Ououd Ou Chouk" in 1971 and "Sabar / Chaaltiha Nar" in 1972. The band gained wide recognition in Morocco, the Arab World and Europe. Later, Les Frères Mégri released two albums in 1974, the first album "Younes et Mahmoud" was a collaboration between Younès and Mahmoud. The second album, released in the same year, "Younes Hassan Mahmoud" was a collaboration between all three brothers. In 2004, Hassan and Jalila released an album "Hassan & Jalila" as Les Mégri.

Discography

Albums 

1974:  Younes et Mahmoud
1974: Younes Hassan Mahmoud
2004:  Hassan & Jalila

Singles
 El Harib / Heya Essamra (Released date unknown)
 Galouli Ensaha / Kellemtini (Released date unknown)
1971:  Sebar / Ououd Ou Chouk
1972: Sabar / Chaaltiha Nar

See also
 Music of Morocco

References

Moroccan musical groups